The Best of Yolanda Adams is an album by gospel singer Yolanda Adams.

Track listing
 You Know That I Know 4:15
 Through The Storm 4:56
 Even Me 5:26
 The Only Way 5:23
 Just A Prayer Away 4:36
 The Battle Is The Lord's 4:25
 Let Us Worship Him 3:37
 Save The World 4:57
 Gotta Have Love 4:22
 The Good Shepherd 5:59
 What About the Children 5:19
 More Than A Melody 4:32
 Is Your All On The Altar? 5:41
 Still I Rise 5:34
 Only Believe 4:30

References

Yolanda Adams albums
1998 greatest hits albums